Herbert Lyle Cramer (October 16, 1894 – October 30, 1963) was an American football, basketball, and baseball player and coach. He served as the head football coach at Marshall University during the 1920 season, compiling a record of 0–8. Cramer was also the head basketball coach at Marshall in 1921–22, tallying a mark of 5–4–1, and the school's head baseball coach in 1921, amassing a record of 3–5.

Head coaching record

Football

References

External links
 

1894 births
1963 deaths
Basketball coaches from Wisconsin
Marshall Thundering Herd athletic directors
Marshall Thundering Herd baseball coaches
Marshall Thundering Herd football coaches
Marshall Thundering Herd men's basketball coaches
Wisconsin Badgers baseball players
Wisconsin Badgers football players
People from Baraboo, Wisconsin
Players of American football from Wisconsin